Harry N. Harrison (died 21 December 1947) was a British trade unionist.

Harrison grew up in Warrington and started an apprenticeship as a tanner.  While an apprentice, he joined a trade union; as a result, his employer sacked him, and Harrison moved to Liverpool to find work.  He became active on Liverpool Trades Council, in the National Union of General and Municipal Workers, and the Confederation of Shipbuilding and Engineering Unions (CSEU).

Harrison was elected to the General Council of the Trades Union Congress (TUC) in 1937, serving until his death.  He also acted as the TUC's delegate to the American Federation of Labour in 1943.  He served for two years as President of the CSEU, and was very active in the formation of the World Federation of Trade Unions.

References

Year of birth missing
1947 deaths
Trade unionists from Cheshire
Trade unionists from Liverpool
Members of the General Council of the Trades Union Congress
People from Warrington